Vennakkara is an area in Palakkad city, Kerala, India. Vennakkara is wards 32 and 33 of Palakkad Municipality.

References

Cities and towns in Palakkad district
Suburbs of Palakkad